Crowcombe is a village and civil parish under the Quantock Hills in Somerset, England,  southeast of Watchet, and  from Taunton.  The village has a population of 489.

The parish covers the hamlets of Crowcombe Heathfield, Flaxpool, Halsway, Lawford and Triscombe.

The village is on the route of the Samaritans Way South West.

History

The first documentary evidence of the village is by Æthelwulf of Wessex in 854, where it was spelt 'Cerawicombe'. At that time the manor belonged to Glastonbury Abbey. Later Gytha Thorkelsdóttir, wife of Earl Godwin, gave it to the monks of Winchester to make amends for her husband's "treacherous abuses of divers monastic institutions".

The Domesday Book of 1086 lists the village as 'Crawcombe', which is believed to come from the Old English words craw and cumb. The parish of Crowcombe was part of the Williton and Freemanners Hundred.

Crowcombe Heathfield railway station is two miles from the village on the West Somerset Railway, a heritage railway. A small part of the filming of The Beatles' first feature film, 'A Hard Day's Night', took place here.

Governance

The parish council has responsibility for local issues, including setting an annual precept (local rate) to cover the council's operating costs and producing annual accounts for public scrutiny. The parish council evaluates local planning applications and works with the local police, district council officers, and neighbourhood watch groups on matters of crime, security, and traffic. The parish council's role also includes initiating projects for the maintenance and repair of parish facilities, as well as consulting with the district council on the maintenance, repair, and improvement of highways, drainage, footpaths, public transport, and street cleaning. Conservation matters (including trees and listed buildings) and environmental issues are also the responsibility of the council.

The village falls within the non-metropolitan district of Somerset West and Taunton, which was established on 1 April 2019. It was previously in the district of West Somerset, which was formed on 1 April 1974 under the Local Government Act 1972, and part of Williton Rural District before that. The district council is responsible for local planning and building control, local roads, council housing, environmental health, markets and fairs, refuse collection and recycling, cemeteries and crematoria, leisure services, parks, and tourism.

Somerset County Council is responsible for running the largest and most expensive local services such as education, social services, libraries, main roads, public transport, policing and fire services, trading standards, waste disposal and strategic planning.

There is an electoral ward termed 'Crowcombe and Stogumber'. This extends westerly from Crowcombe via Stogumber to Willett. The total population at the 2011 Census was 1,191.

It is also part of the Bridgwater and West Somerset county constituency represented in the House of Commons of the Parliament of the United Kingdom. It elects one Member of Parliament (MP) by the first past the post system of election, and was part of the South West England constituency of the European Parliament prior to Britain leaving the European Union in January 2020, which elected seven MEPs using the d'Hondt method of party-list proportional representation.

Geography

It is the central point on the Quantock Greenway a footpath exploring the Quantock Hills.

Roebuck Meadows is a biological Site of Special Scientific Interest for their very varied and herb-rich vegetation composed of mire and grassland communities together comprising an important example of lowland mire, which is a nationally scarce habitat. The meadows contain Cornish moneywort (Sibthorpia europaea), a nationally scarce plant restricted to south-west Britain.

Landmarks

Crowcombe Court

Crowcombe Court is a large country house dating from 1724 to 1739, by Thomas Parker and finished by Nathaniel Ireson of Wincanton. Minor alterations were carried out by Edward Middleton Barry around 1870. It is Grade I listed. It has previously been used as a nursing home and today the Court is hired out for weddings and other functions.

Halsway Manor

Halsway Manor is England's National Centre for Traditional Music, Dance and Song. It is the only residential folk centre in the UK. The eastern end of the building dates from the 15th century with the western end as an addition in the 19th century.

Village cross

It is made of red sandstone. The octagonal shaft is 3 metres (9.8 ft) high, topped by a Greek cross added in the 19th century, standing on an octagonal base. It has been scheduled as an ancient monument and designated as a Grade II* listed building.

Religious sites

The Church of the Holy Ghost has a tower dating from the 14th century with the rest of the building being dated at the 15th century. It has been designated by English Heritage as a Grade I listed building.

In 1724 the spire was damaged by a lightning strike. The top section of the spire was removed and is now planted in the churchyard and stone from the spire was used in the flooring of the church. Inside the church carved bench-ends, dating from 1534, depict such pagan subjects as the Green Man and the legend of the men of Crowcombe fighting a two-headed dragon.

Church House
The Church House and Pound was built around 1515 for parish functions, later being used to house the poor of the village on the lower floor and a school on the upper. Following an appeal for public funds to repair the building in 1907, the ground floor is now being used as a village hall and the upper to house exhibitions. It is a Grade II* listed building. Further grants and public fund raising in 2007 enabled a major refurbishment.

Notable people
Septimus Ridsdale (1840–1884), cricketer

References

External links

 Crowcombe village website

Villages in West Somerset
Civil parishes in Somerset